Frane Matošić (25 November 1918 – 29 October 2007) was a Croatian football player and coach who played as a striker. He is regarded as one of Hajduk Split's greatest players and he is the club's all-time leading goalscorer.

Playing career

Club
Born in Split, Matošić started to play football with HNK Hajduk from Split. In his very first game for Hajduk in 1935 against Slavija from Sarajevo, Matošić scored two goals. He played 16 seasons for Hajduk. His older brother Jozo Matošić was also football player with whom he was a teammate at Hajduk.

While serving the obligatory military service in the season 1939, he played for the BSK from Belgrade. Next season, season 1939–40, he returned to Hajduk. After Hajduk's management suspending the work of Hajduk in 1941, he went abroad to play for Bologna, played in season of 1942–43. When the information about restoring of Hajduk's work came to Frane Matošić, he returned to Croatia and smuggled himself on the free territory. There he joined Hajduk, that restarted its work on the free, Allied-controlled part of Croatia, on the island of Vis. Since then, Matošić was playing the games for Hajduk (that was playing friendly games against Allied teams on the Mediterranean). After the war Matošić as a team captain twice refused Josip Broz Tito's offer of transferring Hajduk to Belgrade and renaming it into "Partizan". All together, Matošić played 739 games for Hajduk and scored impressive 729 goals.

International
Matošić was a long-time Yugoslavia national team player. He played 16 games and scored six goals for Yugoslavia. His last game was in 1953, and in that game he also scored a goal. He was also part of Yugoslavia's squad for the football tournament at the 1948 Summer Olympics, but he did not play in any matches. His final international was a May 1953 World Cup qualification match against Greece.

Managerial career
After the ending of career as player, he turned to coaching career. He was the coach of Hajduk, few years after his brother Jozo was coaching it. He was also the coach of the Tunisia football team and of RNK Split.

Death
Matošić died in Split on the anniversary of Hajduk's historical victory over Red Star Belgrade in 1950.

Honours

Player
Hajduk Split
Banovina of Croatia Championship: 1940–41
Socialist Republic of Croatia Championship: 1945, 1946
Yugoslav First League: 1950, 1952, 1955
BSK Belgrade
Yugoslav First League: 1938–39

Yugoslavia
 Olympic Silver Medal: 1948

Individual
 Socialist Republic of Croatia Championship top goalscorer: 1946
 Yugoslav First League Top Goal Scorer: 1948–49

Manager
RNK Split
Yugoslav Second League (West): 1959–60
Tunisia
Africa Cup of Nations: third place 1962

Records
 Hajduk Split all-time leading goalscorer: 211 goals
 Hajduk Split all-time Leading goalscorer: 729 goals (unofficial matches included)
 Hajduk Split all-time appearance maker: 739 games (unofficial matches included)

References

External links
 
Index.hr Otišao je veliki šjor Frane 
Dnevnik.hr Umro Frane Matošić, najbolji strijelac Hajduka svih vremena 
Het Belang van Limburg - online krant Voetballegende Frane Matosic overleden 
Nogometni-magazin.com Matošić je umro na dan povijesne pobjede nad Crvenom zvezdom iz 1950. godine] 
Kapetan koji je i Titu rekao "ne" 
 Matosic, Legenda Bola Kroasia, Meninggal Dunia 

1918 births
2007 deaths
Footballers from Split, Croatia
Association football forwards
Yugoslav footballers
Yugoslavia international footballers
Olympic footballers of Yugoslavia
Olympic silver medalists for Yugoslavia
Footballers at the 1948 Summer Olympics
Olympic medalists in football
Medalists at the 1948 Summer Olympics
HNK Hajduk Split players
OFK Beograd players
Bologna F.C. 1909 players
Yugoslav First League players
Serie A players
Yugoslav expatriate footballers
Expatriate footballers in Italy
Yugoslav expatriate sportspeople in Italy
Yugoslav football managers
HNK Hajduk Split managers
RNK Split managers
Tunisia national football team managers
1962 African Cup of Nations managers
Yugoslav expatriate football managers
Expatriate football managers in Tunisia
Yugoslav expatriate sportspeople in Tunisia
Burials at Lovrinac Cemetery